Toadfish is the common name for a variety of species from several different families of fish, usually because of their toad-like appearance. "Dogfish" is a name for certain species along the gulf coast.

Dolphin-Toadfish relationship
Toadfish make up a notable portion of the dolphin's diet, approximately 13%. Scientific experiments have shown that the mating call of the toadfish alerts dolphin predators to the fish's location. Similarly, the sounds caused by the dolphin when hunting its prey alert toadfish to the location of the predators and cause the fish to silence their mating call. Male toadfish will reduce their mating calls by up to 50% when they hear the low sound of a dolphin's "pop".

Batrachoididae
The entire family Batrachoididae are called toadfishes. They are benthic ambush predators, known for their ability to produce sound with their swim bladders.

Tetraodontidae
The name "toadfish" is applied to some species of the family Tetraodontidae, including:
 The banded toadfish, Torquigener pleurogramma (Australia)
 The blackspotted toadfish, Arothron nigropunctatus (tropical Indian and Pacific Oceans)
 The common toadfish (or toadfish), Tetractenos hamiltoni (Australia and New Zealand)
 The prickly toadfish, Contusus richei (Australia and New Zealand)
 The red striped toadfish, Tetraodon erythrotaenia (Indonesia and Papua New Guinea)
 The silver-cheeked toadfish, Lagocephalus sceleratus (tropical Indian and Pacific Oceans, invasive in the Mediterranean Sea)
 The smooth toadfish, Tetractenos glaber (Australia)

Psychrolutidae
The name "toadfish" is also applied to some species of the family Psychrolutidae:
 The dark toadfish, Neophrynichthys latus (New Zealand)
 The frilled toadfish, Ambophthalmos magnicirrus (Macquarie Island)
 The pale toadfish, Ambophthalmos angustus (New Zealand)

Gobiidae 
 The toadfish goby, Cryptopsilotris batrachodes (Atlantic Ocean)

References

External links
Fishbase list of species commonly called "toadfish"

Fish common names